La Paz is the administrative capital of Bolivia.

La Paz may also refer to:

Bolivia

 La Paz Department (Bolivia)
 La Paz Municipality, Bolivia
 La Paz River

Argentina
 La Paz, Córdoba
 La Paz, Entre Ríos
 La Paz, Mendoza
 La Paz Department, Catamarca
 La Paz Department, Mendoza

Colombia
 La Paz, Cesar
 La Paz, Santander

Honduras
 La Paz, Honduras
 La Paz Department (Honduras)

Mexico
 La Paz, Baja California Sur, the capital of Baja California Sur state
 La Paz Municipality, Baja California Sur
 La Paz, State of Mexico, a large suburb of Mexico City

Paraguay
 La Paz, Paraguay

Philippines
 La Paz, Abra
 La Paz, Agusan del Sur
 La Paz, Iloilo City, a district of Iloilo City
 La Paz, Leyte
 La Paz, Tarlac

United States
 La Paz County, Arizona
 La Paz, Arizona, a ghost town
 La Paz, California, headquarters of the United Farm Workers
 La Paz, Indiana

Uruguay
 La Paz, Canelones
 La Paz, Colonia

Other places
 Lapaz (Accra), Ghana
 La Paz (Madrid), a neighbourhood of Madrid, Spain named after Hospital Universitario La Paz
 La Paz Department (El Salvador)
 La Paz Waterfall, Costa Rica
 La Paz station (Caracas), a Venezuelan metro station
 La Paz metro station (State of Mexico), a Mexico City Metro station
 La Luz–La Paz station, a Málaga Metro station

Other uses
 La Paz (B&O), a railroad car
 La Paz (band), a Scottish rock band
 La Paz (crater), a crater on Mars
 La Paz F.C., a professional football club from La Paz, Bolivia
 La Paz incident, during the American Civil War
 La Paz Cigars, a brand of cigars made by Swedish Match

See also
 Ciudad de la Paz, future capital of Equatorial Guinea
 La Paz Department (disambiguation)
 La Paz Municipality (disambiguation)
 Paz (disambiguation)